Phirangipuram is a village in Guntur district of the Indian state of Andhra Pradesh. It is located in Phirangipuram mandal of Guntur revenue division.

Demographics 
The average literacy rate stands at 70.25 percent, with  literates.

Government and politics 

Phirangipuram gram panchayat is the local self-government of the village. It is divided into wards and each ward is represented by a ward member. The ward members are headed by a Sarpanch. The village forms a part of Andhra Pradesh Capital Region and is under the jurisdiction of APCRDA.

Education 

As per the school information report for the academic year 2018–19, the village has a total of 19 schools. These include 8 Zilla Parishad/ Mandal Parishad and 11 private schools.

See also 
List of villages in Guntur district

References 

Villages in Guntur district
Mandal headquarters in Guntur district